The 1923 Springfield Red and White football team was an American football team that represented Springfield College as an independent during the 1923 college football season. Led by Edward J. Hickox in his second and final season as head coach, Springfield compiled a record of 0–7. Warren W. Watters the team's captain. Springfield played their home games at Pratt Field in Springfield, Massachusetts.

Schedule

References

Springfield
Springfield Pride football seasons
College football winless seasons
Springfield Red and White football